Terra Diablo is a Scottish rock band signed to Nocturnal Records. The band was formed when singers and guitarists Ian Fairclough and Davey McAuley met while working at the same record store.

They have been managed by Jez Hindmarsh, drummer for Swervedriver, since early 2006.
They have supported the likes of Biffy Clyro, Snow Patrol, Hundred Reasons, Six by Seven, Idlewild, and have played at both the Reading and Leeds Festivals and T in the Park. Their original bassist Paul Wilson left the band in 2005 to join Snow Patrol.

Their second album, Deluge Songs, was produced by Jeremy Parker who has also worked with Evanescence and Mudvayne.

Releases

Albums
 Terra Diablo – 5 July 2004 (Label: Zuma)
 Deluge Songs – 18 September 2007 (Label: Nocturnal)

Singles
 "The Smoke" – 18 November 2002 – (Label: B-Unique)
 "Satellites" video – 28 June 2004 – (Label: Zuma)
(Y)Our Music - 2000 - Not on Label
The Way Things Are And How They're Meant To Be (10") - Zuma - TD1 - 2001

 Swings & Roundabouts (7", Single) - Zuma - ZUMA006 - 2004

References

Scottish rock music groups
Musical groups established in 2000
Musical quartets